Yongfeng Station is a station on the Line 16 of the Beijing Subway. This station is opened in December 2016.

Station layout 
The station has an underground island platform.

Exits 
There are 4 exits, lettered A, B, C, and D. Exits A and C are accessible.

Transport connections

Rail
Schedule as of December 2016:

Bus
Yongfeng Station is located near the Ditie Yongfeng Zhan bus station, which is served by the 446, 515, 575 and 902 bus lines.

References 

Beijing Subway stations in Haidian District
Railway stations in China opened in 2016